Brightwood is a historic home near Hagerstown, Washington County, Maryland, United States. It is an unusually large, -story log-and-stone building with elaborately carved Adamesque features. It features a large two-story galleried portico that is centrally positioned on the front façade, and a one-room two-story tower is centrally positioned on the rear façade. Also on the property are a stone springhouse and a stone smokehouse.

It was listed on the National Register of Historic Places in 1974.

References

External links
, including undated photo, at Maryland Historical Trust

Houses on the National Register of Historic Places in Maryland
Houses in Hagerstown, Maryland
National Register of Historic Places in Washington County, Maryland